Homer is both a masculine given name and a surname. The ancient Greek poet Homer is perhaps the best known person of this name.

Other notable people with the name include:

Given name
Homer Burton Adkins (1892–1949), American chemist
 Homer Martin Adkins (1890–1964), Governor of Arkansas
 Homer D. Angell (1875–1968), American politician
 Homer Banks (1941–2003), African-American songwriter, singer and record producer
 Homer G. Barber (1830–1909), American politician
 Homer Brightman (1901-1988), American screenwriter
 Homer M. Butler (1904–1982), American newspaper editor and politician
 Homer E. Capehart (1897–1979), American businessman and politician, longtime US senator from Indiana
 Homer M. Carr (1878-1964) American politician
 Homer Stille Cummings (1870–1956), United States Attorney General
 Homer Davenport (1867–1912), American political cartoonist, writer and horse breeder
 Homer Davis, Jamaican politician
 Homer B. Dibell (1864–1934), Minnesota Supreme Court justice 
 Homer E. A. Dick (1884–1942), American politician
 Homer L. Ferguson (1873–1953), American author and businessman
 Homer S. Ferguson (1889–1982), US Senator from Michigan
 Homer Gilbert (1909–1943), aka Knuckles Boyle, American football player
 Homer Hickam (born 1943), American author and NASA engineer whose autobiography was the basis of the 1999 film October Sky
 Homer A. Holt (1898–1975), American lawyer and politician, Governor of West Virginia
 Homer Hulbert (1863–1949), American missionary, journalist and political activist
 Homer A. Jack (1916–1993), American clergyman, pacifist and social activist
 Homer Jacobson (fl. 1950s and '60s), American retired chemistry professor
 Homer Jones (American football) (born 1941), American former football player
 Homer Jones (economist) (1906–1986), American economist
 Homer Jones (politician) (1893–1970), American politician
 Homer Eaton Keyes (1875–1938), American author and professor
 Homer Ledford (1927–2006), instrument maker and bluegrass musician
 Homer L. Lyon (1879–1956), American politician
 Homer Martin (labor leader) (1901–1968), American trade unionist and socialist
 Homer C. Martin, American college football head coach (1923–1926, 1936)
 Homer Dodge Martin (1836–1897), American artist
 Homer Mensch (1914–2005), classical bassist
 Homer V. M. Miller (1814–1896), US senator from Georgia
 Homer Neal (1942–2018), American particle physicist and professor
 Homer Nelson (Wisconsin politician) (1826–1894), American politician
 Homer Augustus Nelson (1829–1891), American politician and Civil War colonel
 Homer Plessy (1862–1925), African-American anti-segregationist activist, plaintiff in the United States Supreme Court case Plessy v. Ferguson
 Homer Rice (born 1927), American football player and coach
 Homer Elihu Royce (1820–1891), American lawyer, politician and jurist
 Homer Se (born 1977), former Philippine Basketball Association player
 Homer L. Shantz (1876–1958), American botanist and President of the University of Arizona
 Homer Smith (1895–1962), American physiologist and advocate for science
 Homer Smith (American football) (1931–2011), American college football player and head coach
 Homer Sprague (1829–1918), American military officer, author and educator
 Homer Sykes (born 1949), Canadian-born British photographer
 Homer Tate (1884–1975), American artist
 Homer L. Thomas (1913-2003), American art historian and archaeologist
 Homer Thompson (1906–2000), Canadian archaeologist
 Homer Thompson (baseball) (1891–1957), American Major League Baseball catcher for one game
 Homer Watson (1855–1936), Canadian landscape painter

Surname
 Caroline Homer, Australian midwifery researcher and international women's health rights advocate
 Horatio J. Homer (1848–1923), Boston's first African-American police officer
 LeRoy Homer Jr. (1965–2001), first officer of one of the 9/11 aircraft
 Louise Homer (1871-1947), American operatic contralto 
 Mark Homer, British actor
 Mark S. Homer (born 1962), American politician
 Michael Homer (1958–2009), a Netscape vice president
 Sidney Homer (1864–1953), American composer of "A Plantation Ditty"
 Sonny Homer (1936–2006), former Canadian Football League player
 Tom Homer (footballer) (1886–?), English footballer
 Tom Homer (rugby union) (born 1990), English rugby union player
 Travis Homer (born 1998), American football player
 William Innes Homer 1929–2012), American academic, art historian and author
 Winslow Homer (1836–1910), American painter

Fictional characters
Homer Simpson, in the animated television series The Simpsons.
Homer Simpson, in the 1939 novel The Day of the Locust and its 1975 film adaptation.
Homer Price, in Homer Price and Centerburg Tales, children's books by Robert McCloskey.
 Homer, a stage name/character in the American country music comedy duo Homer and Jethro.
Homer Wells, protagonist of John Irving's novel The Cider House Rules.
Homer, sidekick of Snidely Whiplash.
Homer, in the comic strip Non Sequitur.
Homer Pigeon, a cartoon character.
Homer Roberts, in Netflix's The OA.
Homer Yannos, a character from John Marsden's novel Tomorrow, When the War Began.
Homer D. Poe, the mascot of The Home Depot.
Homer Zuckerman, a character in E.B. White's children's novel Charlotte's Web

Masculine given names
Greek masculine given names
English masculine given names